The 2019 Ohio State Buckeyes football team represented Ohio State University during the 2019 NCAA Division I FBS football season. The Buckeyes played their home games at Ohio Stadium in Columbus, Ohio. This was the Buckeyes' 130th overall season and 107th as a member of the Big Ten Conference. They were led by Ryan Day, in his first season as Ohio State's full-time head coach.

Ohio State began the year ranked fifth in the preseason AP Poll. The Buckeyes climbed to number one in the College Football Playoff rankings by the end of the regular season, after dominating wins over Conference USA champion Florida Atlantic, American Athletic Conference runner-up Cincinnati, and Mid-American Conference champion Miami (OH) in the non-conference schedule; and comfortable wins over ranked Big Ten teams Wisconsin, Penn State, and Michigan in conference play. In the Big Ten Championship Game, Ohio State defeated Wisconsin a second time, by a score of 34–21 to win their third consecutive conference title. In the final CFP rankings of the season, Ohio State dropped from first to second, passed by SEC champion LSU, which placed Ohio State in the Fiesta Bowl to play defending national champion and third-seeded Clemson. Ohio State lost that game, 29–23, to end the year at 13–1.

The Buckeyes were led on offense by sophomore quarterback Justin Fields, an incoming transfer from Georgia that was granted a waiver for immediate eligibility by the NCAA. He led the Big Ten with 3,273 passing yards and 41 passing touchdowns to go along with 10 rushing touchdowns, and finished third in voting for the Heisman Trophy. Running back J. K. Dobbins became the first Buckeye running back to eclipse the 2,000 yard mark, finishing tied atop the Big Ten with Wisconsin's Jonathan Taylor at 2,003 yards and 21 touchdowns. On defense, Ohio State was led by defensive end Chase Young, who led the country with 16.5 sacks and won several defensive player of the year awards while also finishing fourth in Heisman Trophy voting. He was also named a unanimous All-American, along with cornerback Jeff Okudah. Head coach Ryan Day was named Big Ten Coach of the Year by the media, becoming the first Ohio State head coach to win it since Earle Bruce in 1979.

Previous season
The Buckeyes finished the 2018 season 13–1, 8–1 in Big Ten play to win the East division. They defeated Northwestern in the Big Ten Championship 45–24. However, despite a 12–1 record, they failed to receive an invitation to the College Football Playoff. Instead, they received a bid to the Rose Bowl where they defeated Washington 28–23. This was the final season for Urban Meyer as the Buckeyes' head coach, who coached at Ohio State for seven seasons. In January 2019, it was announced Georgia Quarterback Justin Fields would be transferring to Ohio State.

Preseason

Spring Game
The 2019 Spring Game was held at Ohio Stadium on April 13, 2019, with the Gray team defeating the Scarlet team, 35–17.

Preseason Big Ten poll
Although the Big Ten Conference has not held an official preseason poll since 2010, Cleveland.com has polled sports journalists representing all member schools as a de facto preseason media poll since 2011. For the 2019 poll, Ohio State was projected to finish in second in the East Division behind Michigan.

Schedule
Ohio State's 2019 schedule will begin with two non-conference home games, first against Florida Atlantic of Conference USA and then against Cincinnati of the American Athletic Conference. Ohio State's third non-conference game, a home game against Miami (OH) of the Mid-American Conference, will be played after the Buckeyes' conference opener against Indiana.

In Big Ten Conference play, Ohio State will play all members of the East Division and draws Nebraska, Northwestern, and Wisconsin from the West Division.

Schedule Source:

Personnel

Roster

Coaching changes

On December 4, 2018, Head Coach Urban Meyer announced his retirement from coaching effective after the 2019 Rose Bowl Game. Ryan Day was announced as his replacement.
On December 8, 2018, Interim Wide Receivers Coach Brian Hartline was promoted to full-time Wide Receivers coach.
On January 2, 2019, Oklahoma State Offensive Coordinator Mike Yurcich was hired by Ohio State as the new Passing Game Coordinator and Quarterbacks coach.
On January 4, 2019, Ohio State Co-Defensive Coordinator and Safeties coach Alex Grinch was hired by Oklahoma as Defensive Coordinator.
On January 7, 2019, Defensive Coordinator Greg Schiano and Linebackers Coach Billy Davis were fired by Ohio State, and replaced with Michigan Defensive line coach Greg Mattison and former San Francisco 49ers Defensive backs coach Jeff Hafley. Mattison and Hafley will serve as Co-Defensive Coordinators.
Also On January 7, 2019, Defensive Line Coach Larry Johnson was promoted to Associate Head Coach, while continuing his duties as defensive line coach, he takes over for former Associate Head Coach Greg Schiano who was fired earlier that day.
On January 8, 2019, Ohio State hired Michigan Linebackers Coach Al Washington as the new Linebackers coach.

Depth chart
Starters and backups.

Rankings

Game summaries

Florida Atlantic

Summary

The No. 5 Ohio State Buckeyes (0-0, 0-0) faced the Florida Atlantic Owls (0-0, 0-0) in a home match up, and the first game under new head coach Ryan Day.  The Buckeyes came in as heavy favorites over Lane Kiffin's Owls.

The Buckeyes found quick success on their opening possession on a 51-yard touchdown run from Georgia transfer Justin Fields. The offense went on to score three more touchdowns in the first quarter to take a 28–0 lead. The remainder of the half resulted only in a 28-yard FAU field goal to give the Buckeyes a 28-3 halftime lead.

The FAU offense would score a field goal on their opening possession to make it a three-possession game. The Buckeyes continued their woes until 2:37 left in the third quarter when Fields threw a 3-yard touchdown pass to tight end Jeremy Ruckert. The third quarter ended with the Buckeyes up 35–6. The fourth quarter had two drives that resulted in 14-points for the Owls and 10 for the Buckeyes.

Ohio State allowed 22 rushing yards behind defensive end Chase Young, who had a total of five tackles, 1.5 sacks and a pass deflection.

Statistics

Cincinnati

Summary

The Cincinnati Bearcats (1-0, 0-0) had high hopes in defeating the No. 5 Ohio State Buckeyes (1-0, 0-0) after beating UCLA the previous week. The last win the Bearcats had over the Buckeyes was in 1897.

The Buckeyes took an early lead when the offense scored on their second possession, halfway through the first quarter. The Buckeye offense held the Bearcats to only two first downs in the opening quarter. The first scoring opportunity for Cincinnati came at the 11:29 mark with a 32-yard field goal that was blocked by Chase Young. The following three drives would result in three touchdowns by the Buckeyes and three punts by the Bearcats to make the halftime score 28-0 Ohio State.

Ohio State would score 14 more points in the second half and hold the Bearcats scoreless. The Bearcats had and opportunity to score when they got down to the OSU 4 but linebacker Tuf Borland intercepted a pass, thwarting the redzone attempt.

The shutout was the first for Ohio State since 2017 against Rutgers. Ohio State punter Drue Chrisman was named Big Ten Special Teams Player of the Week for his performance.

Statistics

at Indiana

Summary

The No. 6 Ohio State Buckeyes (2-0, 0-0) faced Big Ten East Division foe Indiana Hoosiers (2-0, 0-0) in Bloomington, Indiana. Indiana hoped to snap a 23-game Ohio State win streak that began in 1989.

Ohio State and Indiana traded scores in the first quarter to give the Buckeyes a 7–3 lead. The second quarter heavily favored Ohio State scoring three touchdowns and a safety on a blocked punt by Chris Olave. The Hoosiers scored their only touchdown of the game with 1:07 left in the second quarter, making the halftime score 30–10, Ohio State.

OSU went on to score touchdowns on their two opening possessions and intercepting an Indiana pass for a 96-yard return by Damon Arnette. Neither team would score again, making the final 51–10. Ohio State held the Hoosiers to just 42 yards rushing, making it the second time in three games that they held their opponent to under 100 yards.

J. K. Dobbins was named Big Ten co-Offensive Player of the Week for his 193-yard rushing and two total touchdown performance.

Statistics

Miami (OH)

Summary

The No. 6 Ohio State Buckeyes (3-0, 1-0) faced the Miami RedHawks (1-2, 0-0) from the Mid-American Conference at Ohio Stadium. Ohio State came in as heavy favorites, having never lost to the RedHawks.

The Buckeyes found themselves quickly in a hole, trailing Miami 5-0 following a safety and a field goal halfway through the first quarter. Ohio State was able to finally score and take the lead on a 7-play, 75-yard drive that was topped off by a J. K. Dobbins 26-yard run at the 5:16 mark of the first quarter. The Buckeyes would go on to score touchdowns on all six of their possessions of the second quarter, and the defense would force three Miami turnovers. The Buckeyes lead at halftime 49–5.

Ohio State went to tack on two more touchdowns in both the third and fourth quarters and allowing the Miami offense to only gain 29 net yards. Ohio State scored their largest win since 2013.

Statistics

at Nebraska

Summary

The No. 5 Ohio State Buckeyes (4-0, 1-0) faced the Nebraska Cornhuskers (3-1, 1-0) in a cross-divisional match up. The game would be featured on College GameDay. The previous match up ended with a narrow five-point Ohio State victory. The one and only Nebraska victory came in 2011 when the Cornhuskers defeated the Buckeyes 34–27 in Lincoln, Nebraska.

Nebraska began the game on a 31-yard drive that ended in an Adrian Martinez interception. The Buckeyes were able to take advantage of the turnover and drive 50 yards to score a Justin Fields touchdown run. The Buckeyes forced a three-and-out and scored another touchdown following a 60-yard drive. For the remainder of the half, Ohio State would score three more touchdowns and a field goal while intercepting two more Martinez passes and forcing three Cornhuskers' punts. Ohio State lead 38–0 at the half.

The Buckeyes were able to score 10 more points in the second half and the Cornhuskers were able to get on the board late in the third quarter, ending Ohio State's streak of eight quarters without allowing a touchdown. The final score ended in favor of Ohio State 48–7.

Statistics

Michigan State

Summary

The No. 4 Ohio State Buckeyes (5-0, 2-0) faced the No. 25T Michigan State Spartans (4-1, 2-0) in an East Division contest. Ohio State wore all-black uniforms for the third time in the program's history. Ohio State came in to the game as 16-point favorites over the Spartans.

After the Buckeyes were forced to punt the ball on their initial possession, the Spartans fumbled the ball twice in four plays giving the Buckeyes two recoveries deep in their own territory. The turnovers resulted in three points from two field goal attempts. The Buckeyes would take a ten-point lead early in the second quarter, which was matched by the Spartans on the following drive, making the score 10–7, Ohio State. Michigan State was able to get another field goal before the end of the half, while Ohio State scored 17 additional points, making the halftime score 27–10, Ohio State.

Michigan State would not score any more during the game though they did attempt a 27-yard field goal in their opening possession of the second half. Ohio State would score again in the fourth quarter making the final 34–10. Notably, Justin Fields would throw his first interception of the season and fumble the ball away in the second half.

This game was the fourth time during the season that the defense allowed under 100 rushing yards.

Statistics

at Northwestern

Summary

The No. 4 Ohio State Buckeyes (6-0, 3-0), faced Big Ten West Divisional opponent Northwestern Wildcats (1-4, 0-3) in a Friday night game at Ryan Field in Evanston, Illinois. Ohio State came in to the game as 27-point favorites over the Wildcats.

The game was originally set to air on FS1, but two days before the game, Fox decided to move the game to the Big Ten Network in order to air Game 5 of the 2019 American League Championship Series on FS1 instead.

Ohio State opened the game with a 10-play, 70-yard drive that resulted in a 20-yard touchdown pass from Justin Fields to Chris Olave. Northwestern followed with a quick first down run by Kyric McGowan on their first offensive play but after a Chase Young sack that put them well behind the chains, they were forced to punt. The Wildcats were able to force a three-and-out from the Buckeyes and muster together a nine-play, 44-yard drive that resulted in a 33-yard Charlie Kuhbander field goal to make the score 7–3.

Ohio State would go on to score touchdowns on their next two possessions, increasing their lead to 21–3. Northwestern attempted to punt on 4-and-7 at their own 24 with 4:10 left in the second half, but a bad snap gave the Buckeyes a first down at the 15, which resulted in a touchdown two plays later, increasing the lead to 28–3. Two drives later, Ohio State trapped Northwestern at their own 1 which resulted in a punt that only made it to the 36. With 0:04 left in the half, Ohio State's Blake Haubeil kicked a career-long 55-yard field goal with time expiring to give Ohio State a 31-3 halftime lead. Ohio State allowed only 85-yards in the first half.

Ohio State would go on to score three more touchdowns in the second half including a 73-yard run from Master Teague. Ohio State ended allowing only 199 total yards, 42 of which were passing. They won by a final score 52–3. J. K. Dobbins finished the game with 121 yards rushing which put him into the top five in total rushing yards in Ohio State's history.  Statistics

Wisconsin

Summary

The No. 3 Ohio State Buckeyes (7-0, 4-0) defeated their Big Ten West Divisional opponent the No. 13 Wisconsin Badgers (6-1, 3-1) by a score of 38–7 in a cross-divisional matchup. While the game received national attention for both teams' top defenses, Ohio State was favored by 14.5 points. Fox Sports chose this game to be the host of Big Noon Kickoff.

As the game began, rain fell at Ohio Stadium making the conditions very wet. Defense reigned supreme in the first quarter, as was expected. The Buckeyes were only able to gain 44 yards of total offense while Wisconsin put together 59. Passing appeared to be tough for both teams, forcing them to trade punts. The game was tied at 0–0 at the end of the first.

It wasn't until the 6:56 mark of the second quarter, when Ohio State's Blake Haubeil made a 49-yard field goal, that the stalemate was broken. Ohio State was able to halt Wisconsin's ensuing drive and get the ball back with 2:37 remaining. The Buckeyes found success on the drive and were able to drive 85 yards and score on a 27-yard pass from Justin Fields to Chris Olave. This score gave the Buckeyes a 10–0 lead at halftime.

Ohio State received the second-half kick which ended after failing to convert a first down. The Badgers were able to partially block their punt and it only went 13 yards, giving Wisconsin prime field position. In three plays, Wisconsin scored on a 26-yard touchdown pass from Jack Coan to AJ Taylor, making the score 10–7. Following the Wisconsin score, Ohio State would go on to score touchdowns on their next four drives, while Wisconsin would punt twice and fumble twice. The game would end with the Buckeyes winning 38–7.

J. K. Dobbins would be awarded Big Ten Offensive Player of the Week honors for his 221-yard, two-touchdown performance. Chase Young would be named Big Ten Defensive Player of the Week and Walter Camp National Player of the Week after recording four sacks and two forced fumbles.

Statistics

Maryland

Summary

The No. 1 Ohio State Buckeyes (8-0, 5-0) defeated the Maryland Terrapins (2-6, 1-5) 73–14, in an East Division match up at Ohio Stadium in Columbus, Ohio.

On Friday, November 8, the day before the game, it was announced that Chase Young was being withheld from the game and is suspended indefinitely (later reduced to two games) due to a potential violation of NCAA rules. Shortly after the announcement, Young acknowledged that he had accepted a loan from a family friend the year before, which he has since repaid.

Ohio State began the game by forcing the Terrapins to a three-and-out. On the Buckeyes' ensuing possession, Ohio State drove 47 yards in six plays to score a touchdown on a 12-yard pass from Justin Fields to Binjimen Victor. Ohio State would force another three-and-out on Maryland's next possession and would score again on an 11-play, 71-yard drive, giving the Buckeyes a 14–0 lead. Following the second scoring drive, the Buckeyes would conduct a successful onside kick and score again, giving OSU a 21–0 lead at the end of the first quarter. Ohio State would score three more touchdowns on their next three drives giving Ohio State a 42-0 halftime lead.

Ohio State began the second half with most of their second string in the game. Ohio State quarterback Chris Chugunov lead the offense into the red zone on the first drive of the second half, but fumbled the ball when he was sacked. On the next play, Maryland threw an interception which lead to a Buckeye touchdown two plays later. Ohio State would kick a field goal a drive later to give them a 52–0 lead. Maryland would be able to find the end zone twice, and Ohio State would find it three more times, to end the game 73–14.

Statistics

at Rutgers

The No. 2 Ohio State Buckeyes (9-0, 6-0) defeated the Rutgers Scarlet Knights (2-7, 0-6) by a score of 56–21 in a Big Ten East matchup at SHI Stadium in Piscataway, New Jersey. Ohio State was heavily favored in the game, with the line being 52 points. It also was the largest spread in Big Ten Conference history and the largest for both teams. This was also the largest spread in the NCAA since the 1989 NCAA Division I-A football season.

Turnovers on its first two possessions ruined any hopes for Rutgers as Justin Fields threw four touchdown passes. An interception and a fumble led to a 14–0 lead for Ohio State in the opening 3:36 on an 18-yard run by J. K. Dobbins and an 11-yard catch by Binjimen Victor for the first of his two TDs. Fields threw for a career best 305 yards on 15 of 19 completions. He has 31 TDs and one interception this season. Sophomore receiver Chris Olave set a career high with 139 yards on four catches.

Rutgers had two shining moments in the first half. After Dobbins' 8-yard run made it 21–0, the Scarlet Knights took advantage of a muffed punt return by Garrett Wilson and made it 21-7 late in the first quarter on a 26-yard TD run from Isiah Pacheco.

In the second quarter, Ohio State had third-and-goal from the 1 but Dobbins was stuffed for no gain, then dropped for a 1-yard loss. Ohio State had a 35-7 halftime lead and Fields quickly extended it to 42–7 with a 14-yard strike to Luke Farrell at 13:33 of the third on the QB's last snap of the game. Rutgers' Johnny Langan was 12 for 26 for 121 yards, an interception and a 45-yard TD pass to Bo Melton late in the third quarter against the backup secondary to make it 49–14.  New Jersey resident Chris Chungunov replaced him and added two more TD tosses, a 4-yarder to Jake Hausmann and a 32-yarder to Jaelen Gill.

Langan had a 1-yard run left with 1:09 in the game making the final score 56–21.

Statistics

Penn State

The No. 2 Ohio State Buckeyes (10-0, 7-0) defeated their rivals, the No. 8 Penn State Nittany Lions (9-1, 6-1) 28–17 in a Big Ten East matchup in Columbus, Ohio. Ohio State's campus hosted several television networks before the game. Most notably, ESPN College Gameday, FOX Sports' Big Noon Kickoff and Big Ten Network's BTN Tailgate. This was Ryan Day's first contest against Penn State, while it was James Franklin's sixth. Franklin is 1–5 against the Buckeyes with three of the last four games being decided by a total of five points. Ohio State entered the game as 20 point favorites over Penn State.

Chase Young was reinstated to the lineup starting with this game after serving a two-game suspension for violation of NCAA rules due to Young accepting a loan from a family friend the year before, which he has since repaid.

Statistics

at Michigan (The Game)

The No. 1 Ohio State Buckeyes (11-0, 8-0) defeated their archrival, the No. 13 Michigan Wolverines (9-2, 6-2) by a score of 56–27, in a Big Ten East matchup known as "The Game" at Michigan Stadium in Ann Arbor, Michigan. Ohio State entered into the game as 9 point favorites.

Statistics

Big Ten Championship Game

vs Wisconsin

The No. 1 Ohio State Buckeyes (12-0, 9-0) out of the Big Ten East defeated the No. 8 Wisconsin Badgers (10-2, 7-2) out of the Big Ten West by a score of 34–21 in the Big Ten Championship Game at Lucas Oil Stadium in Indianapolis, Indiana. Ohio State entered into the game as 15½-16½ point favorites.

Statistics

Fiesta Bowl – CFP Semifinal Game

vs. Clemson

The No. 2 Ohio State Buckeyes (13-0) took on the No. 3 Clemson Tigers (13-0) in the Fiesta Bowl at State Farm Stadium in Glendale, Arizona. Ohio State entered the game as 2 point underdogs.

Statistics

Awards and honors 

(*) denotes unanimous selection

All-American Players 

*The NCAA and Ohio State only recognize the AP, AFCA, FWAA, Sporting News and WCFF All-American teams to determine if a player is a Consensus or Unanimous All-American. To be named a Consensus All-American, a player must be named first team in three polls and to be Unanimous, they must be named first team in all five.

See 2019 College Football All-America Team

Players drafted into the NFL

References

Ohio State
Ohio State Buckeyes football seasons
Big Ten Conference football champion seasons
Ohio State Buckeyes football